Henry Gough-Calthorpe, 1st Baron Calthorpe (1 January 1749 – 16 March 1798), known until 1796 as Sir Henry Gough, 2nd Baronet, was a British politician who sat in the House of Commons from 1774 to 1796 when he was raised to the peerage.

Early life
Gough was the son of Sir Henry Gough, 1st Baronet, by his first wife Barbara Calthorpe, the only daughter of Reynolds Calthorpe of Hampshire. On 8 June 1774 he succeeded to his father's title and estates.

Political career
In the 1774 general election, Gough was returned as the Member of Parliament for Bramber, a rotten borough controlled by his family. He was returned again in 1780 and  1784. He took the additional surname of Calthorpe by royal licence in 1788 on succeeding to the estates of his maternal uncle, Sir Henry Calthorpe. He was returned again for Bramber in 1790. On 16 June 1796, he was created Baron Calthorpe, of Calthorpe in the County of Norfolk, in the Peerage of Great Britain, and gave up his seat in the House of Commons.

Family
On 1 May 1783, Gough-Calthorpe married Frances Carpenter, the second daughter and co-heiress of General Benjamin Carpenter. They had eight children:
Henry Gough-Calthorpe (24 January 1784 – 4 November 1790, predeceasing his father)
Hon. Charles Gough-Calthorpe, later 2nd Baron Calthorpe (1786–1807)
Hon. George Gough-Calthorpe, later 3rd Baron Calthorpe (1787–1851)
Hon. Frederick Gough-Calthorpe later Frederick Gough, 4th Baron Calthorpe (1790–1868)
Hon. John Gough-Calthorpe (5 May 1793 – 10 June 1816)
Hon. Arthur Gough-Calthorpe (14 November 1796 – 5 March 1836)
Hon. Frances Elizabeth Gough-Calthorpe (c. 1785 – 2 September 1868)
Hon. Harriet Gough-Calthorpe (died 12 February 1813)

The first baron was succeeded in the baronetcy, his eldest son having predeceased him, by his next three sons in turn. The widowed Lady Calthorpe took up residence in Grosvenor Square. She died on 1 May 1827, while visiting Brighton.

Arms

References

1749 births
1798 deaths
Peers of Great Britain created by George III
British MPs 1774–1780
British MPs 1780–1784
British MPs 1784–1790
British MPs 1790–1796
Gough-Calthorpe family
1